The Eastern Theater Command Ground Force is the ground force under the Eastern Theater Command. Its headquarters is in Fuzhou, Fujian. The current commander is Kong Jun and the current political commissar is Zhang Hongbing.

History 
The Eastern Theater Command Ground Force was officially established on 31 December 2015 with the troops of former Nanjing Military Region.

Functional department 
 General Staff
 Political Work Department
 Logistics Department
 Equipment department
 Disciplinary Inspection Committee

Direct units

Direct troops

Group army 
 71st Group Army (stations in Xuzhou, Jiangsu)
 72nd Group Army (stations in Huzhou, Zhejiang)
 73rd Group Army (stations in Xiamen, Fujian)

Other army 
 First Brigade of Reconnaissance Intelligence
 First Brigade of Information Support
 First Brigade of Electronic Warfare
 First Brigade of Long Range Rocket Artillery
 31st Brigade of Boat and Bridge Army
 301st Brigade of Coastal Defense Force (stations in Haimen District of Nantong, Jiangsu)
 302nd Brigade of Coastal Defense Force (stations in Zhoushan, Zhejiang)
 303rd Brigade of Coastal Defense Force (stations in Changle District of Fuzhou, Fujian)
 304th Brigade of Coastal Defense Force (stations in Xiamen, Fujian)

List of leaders

Commanders

Political commissars

Chief of staffs

References 

Eastern Theater Command
Nanjing Military Region
Military units and formations established in 2015
2015 establishments in China